Jana Lubasová (born 22 November 1979) is a Czech former professional tennis player.

Lubasová had a career high singles ranking of 360 in the world and qualified for the main draw of one WTA Tour tournament, the 1995 Prague Open. As a doubles player she had a top ranking of 258, winning five ITF titles.

In 2007 she was a doubles world champion in the sport of racketlon.

ITF finals

Singles: 2 (0–2)

Doubles: 5 (5–0)

References

External links
 
 

1979 births
Living people
Czech female tennis players
20th-century Czech women